Fishergate Baptist Church in Fishergate, Preston, Lancashire, England was an active Baptist church for more than 150 years, but is now redundant. The church is recorded in the National Heritage List for England as a designated Grade II listed building, the lowest of its three grades of listing.

History

The church was built in 1857–58 to a design by James Hibbert and Nathan Rainford. It was for many years an active church, but has been redundant since 2011. The church was advertised for sale in 2011, at a price of £500,000. Reverend Phil Jump said the building had a basement which had been home to many voluntary groups and that it would be "a shame to see them without a base". The church was for a number of years the focal point for outreach activities for the homeless in the city.

Architecture

Exterior
Fishergate Baptist Church is built in sandstone with slate roofs, and is in Italian Romanesque style. It has a rectangular plan, is in two storeys with a basement, and has a symmetrical entrance front facing the street.  Eight steps lead up to a double doorway, each door having an arch in Mozarabic style, and both contained in a round-headed arch.  Flanking the doorway are two round-arched windows on each side.  The doorways and windows have pilasters with carved imposts, and above them is a cornice.  The upper part of the entrance front contains corner pilasters and a pediment, the pediment containing a large wheel window and two smaller ones, all with hood moulds. The rear of the church is gabled; the gable also contains a large wheel window, and two two-light mullioned windows. Along the sides of the church are gabled projections, each containing a pair of windows. At the southeast corner of the church is a tower.  In the ground floor of the tower is a round-arched doorway, in the first stage is a single lancet window, and in the second stage are pairs of lancets; all of these are in Mozarabic style.  On each side of the third stage there is a clock face with a pair of oculi above, all with hood moulds.  Over these is a cornice with carvings of birds projecting from the corners, and a tall pyramidal roof.

Interior
Steeply pointed arcades inside the church are carried on square piers.  Doors at the far end of the building are flanked by foliated shafts, and a gallery with cast iron balusters.  The church also contains monuments to members of the Sellrers family, dating from the late 19th century. The two-manual pipe organ was made by Henry Ainscough of Preston in 1870, and repaired by the same company in 1954; its case is decorated with putti.

Appraisal

The church was designated a Grade II listed building on 29 January 1986, the lowest of its three grades of listing that is applied to buildings that are "nationally important and of special interest". Hartwell and Pevsner in the Buildings of England series comment that the tower is "rather starved".

See also

Listed buildings in Preston, Lancashire

References

Grade II listed churches in Lancashire
Former Baptist churches in England
Churches in Preston
Churches completed in 1858
Former churches in Lancashire